Nautanwa railway station is a small railway station in Maharajganj district, Uttar Pradesh. Its code is NTV. It serves Nautanwa city. The station consists of two platforms. The platforms are not well sheltered. It lacks many facilities including water and sanitation.

The station is close to Lumbini in Nepal and it is the last station in India. The two countries have an open border without restrictions on the movement of Nepalese and Indian nationals. There is a customs checkpoint for goods and third-country nationals.

Trains 

Some of the trains that run from Nautanwa are:

 Gorakhpur–Nautanwa Passenger
 Durg–Nautanwa Express (via Varanasi)
 Gorakhpur–Nautanwa Express 
 Durg–Nautanwa Express (via Sultanpur)

References

Railway stations in Maharajganj district
Lucknow NER railway division